"If I Had You" is a song recorded by singer Karen Carpenter during her solo sessions in New York with producer Phil Ramone for her subsequently shelved debut solo album. In 1989, "If I Had You" was released as a Karen Carpenter solo single (featuring Richard Carpenter's remix ending), along with "The Uninvited Guest" (an outtake from the Carpenters album Made in America), also credited as a Karen Carpenter solo, as its B-side (in Japan the B-side was "Lovelines", another track from Karen's solo album, also the title track from the 1989 Carpenters Lovelines album). The single was the first single from the Carpenters' album Lovelines. As of 2019, this is also the last Carpenters single released to American radio. The single version has also appeared on numerous Carpenters compilations since its release. The single reached number 18 on the Billboard Adult Contemporary chart.

The original version, featuring the fade-out ending has only appeared on Karen Carpenter's 1996 solo album.

Charts

References

1979 songs
1989 singles
The Carpenters songs
Karen Carpenter songs
Song recordings produced by Phil Ramone
Songs written by Steve Dorff